The 2001 Kilkenny Senior Hurling Championship was the 107th staging of the Kilkenny Senior Hurling Championship since its establishment by the Kilkenny County Board in 1887.

Graigue-Ballycallan were the defending champions.

On 14 October 2001, O'Loughlin Gaels won the title after a 1–17 to 1–06 defeat of Graigue-Ballycallan in the final at Nowlan Park. It was their first ever championship title.

Team changes

To Championship

Promoted from the Kilkenny Intermediate Hurling Championship
 Dunnamaggin

From Championship

Relegated to the Kilkenny Intermediate Hurling Championship
 Clara

Results

First round

Relegation play-offs

Quarter-finals

Semi-finals

Final

Championship statistics

Top scorers

Top scorers overall

Top scorers in a single game

References

Kilkenny Senior Hurling Championship
Kilkenny Senior Hurling Championship